Ana "Bia" Beatriz Caselato Gomes de Figueiredo, or Bia Figueiredo (born March 18, 1985) is a Brazilian racing driver. She won her first Indy Lights race at Nashville Superspeedway on 12 July 2008, becoming the first woman to win a race in the Indy Lights series. On June 20, 2009, Bia won her second Indy Lights race and became the first woman to win a race car event at Iowa Speedway in Newton, Iowa.

Career

Early career
Ana started her career in karting races. Initially funded by her family, "Bianinha" ("Little Bia") began kart racing at age eight.

At the age of 12, racing coach Nailor Campos, former coach of racers Tony Kanaan, Rubens Barrichello, Enrique Bernoldi and Andre Ribeiro, became her coach and chief mechanic. When Bia's family could no longer fund her racing endeavors at the age of 15, Campos helped her attain sponsorship from the Medley pharmaceutical company, owned by former racer Xandy (Pollini) Negrão, father of racer Alexandre Sarnes Negrão.

With formal sponsorship, Bia finished as runner-up in a variety of karting championships and won the Sorriso Petrobrás Kart Cup championship in 2003.

After three seasons in the Brazilian Formula Renault championship, Ana started competing in Formula Three Sudamericana in 2006, driving for the well-established Cesario Formula team. In 2006, she also drove a Red Bull Volkswagen Touareg for PPD Sports, owned by Pedro Diniz.

2008
In 2008, Bia began racing in the American Firestone Indy Lights Series for defending championship-winning team Sam Schmidt Motorsports under the name Ana Beatriz. Prior to racing in the United States, she was referred to as "Bia", not "Ana", and many people, including Bia herself, continue to call her "Bia". Several American reporters have begun to use the name Ana "Bia" Beatriz in their written articles.

Bia placed fifth in the Firestone Freedom 100 at Indianapolis Motor Speedway on 23 May 2008, the highest finishing position by a female driver in that race. On 12 July 2008, she led the most laps and won her first Indy Lights race at Nashville Superspeedway.

With the excitement surrounding Bia's victory a reporter asked if she was the next Danica Patrick. She responded "Everybody is making that comparison... But I always say that I'm always going to be Bia. I'm never going to be Danica... I hope there is a place for a Bia now."

2008 Awards
The results she demonstrated on and off the track gained the attention of many, and as a result, she was awarded the Tony Renna Rising Star Award. Named after the late driver, the award was given to Beatriz for demonstrating qualities as Renna—teamwork, physical fitness, and resourcefulness.

Also, her third-place result in the final championship standings earned her 
"Rookie of the Year" honors and places her in a position to be a 
championship contender in 2009.

2009
Bia returned to the #20 Sam Schmidt car for 2009. She was forced to miss the Milwaukee Mile race due to a lack of funding caused by a hard crash in the Freedom 100 the prior week. However, a week later she won the race at the Iowa Speedway, her second series win. She also skipped the final race of the season due to funding issues. She finished 8th in points despite missing the two races.

2010

Bia's official Portuguese language site revealed on 23 February 2010 that she will drive a third car for Dreyer & Reinbold Racing in the São Paulo Indy 300 in March 2010. Further participation in the 2010 IndyCar Series season was confirmed and announced on May 12, 2010. Bia qualified for the 2010 Indianapolis 500 on the outside of row seven with a four–lap average of 224.243 MPH and finished in 21st position after retiring on the final lap of the race, as she was involved in an accident with Ryan Hunter-Reay and teammate Mike Conway.

In December, she won the second race of the Brazilian karting event, Desafio Internacional das Estrelas. Bia became a fan favorite in the event as she went from her starting position of 11th to 1st, overtaking experienced drivers such as Tony Kanaan, Felipe Massa and Rubens Barrichello in the process. She ended 4th in the final standings despite scoring the same number of points as the winner, Lucas di Grassi (it was a four-way tie).

2011
For the 2011 IndyCar Series season she competed full-time for Dreyer & Reinbold Racing in the #24 car. Bia broke her wrist in the opening laps of the first race at St. Petersburg causing her to miss the next race and requiring her to compete with a brace for the large part of the season.

2012
On March 8, 2012, Bia tested for Andretti Autosport, driving James Hinchcliffe's car #27 during a session of the open test at Sebring, with an eye to her running that team's fourth car at April's IndyCar Series event in her home town of São Paulo.
On April 5 it was announced that she would compete in the 2012 São Paulo and Indianapolis races for Andretti Autosport with assistance from Conquest Racing.

2015–present
Since 2015, she has settled in touring cars in her homeland 

She guest voice acted the character Bia in Mickey and the Roadster Racers.

Motorsports career results

American open–wheel results 
(key)

Indy Lights

IndyCar Series

Indianapolis 500

Complete Stock Car Brasil results

† Driver did not finish the race, but was classified as she completed over 90% of the race distance.

Complete IMSA WeatherTech SportsCar Championship results
(key) (Races in bold indicate pole position) (Races in italics indicate fastest lap)

References

External links
 
 
 Ana Beatriz at IndyCar.com
 Torcida Bia Figueiredo fan site
 New York Times feature on Bia, October 2006
 IndyCar 11 in '11 video

Living people
1985 births
Racing drivers from São Paulo
Brazilian racing drivers
Indianapolis 500 drivers
IndyCar Series drivers
Brazilian IndyCar Series drivers
Female IndyCar Series drivers
Indy Lights drivers
Formula 3 Sudamericana drivers
Brazilian Formula Renault 2.0 drivers
A1 Grand Prix Rookie drivers
Stock Car Brasil drivers
24 Hours of Daytona drivers
Brazilian WeatherTech SportsCar Championship drivers
Arrow McLaren SP drivers
Dreyer & Reinbold Racing drivers
Dale Coyne Racing drivers
Conquest Racing drivers
Meyer Shank Racing drivers
Andretti Autosport drivers